Simpson Grant McCall (December 5, 1807 – April 25, 1899) was an Ontario farmer, businessman and political figure. He represented Norfolk South in the Legislative Assembly of Ontario from 1867 to 1874.

He was born in Vittoria, Ontario in Norfolk County in 1807. He owned a general store and was postmaster at Vittoria from 1834 to 1868. He was named justice of the peace in 1845. He served on the District and County councils from 1847 to 1864.

External links

Transcription from Illustrated Historical Atlas of Norfolk County (1877)
The Canadian parliamentary companion, HJ Morgan (1871)

1807 births
1899 deaths
Canadian justices of the peace
Ontario Liberal Party MPPs
People from Norfolk County, Ontario
Persons of National Historic Significance (Canada)